Koshoy Korgon or Qoshoy Qorgon is a ruined fortress of uncertain date located in At-Bashy District, Kyrgyzstan.  The structure, which consists of walls made of mud enclosing a large area and is identified as a korgon ("fortress", not to be confused with a kurgan), is immediately to the southeast of Kara-Suu village, and a little ways west of At-Bashy village.  It is named after Qoshoy baatyr, one of Manas's generals, who is thought to have been a catalyst for its construction.  There is an on-site museum for tourists that is rarely open.

References

Archaeological sites in Kyrgyzstan